Meriania leucantha is a species of plant in the family Melastomataceae. It is endemic to Jamaica.

References

Endemic flora of Jamaica
leucantha
Near threatened plants
Taxonomy articles created by Polbot
Taxa named by Olof Swartz